Switzerland is a federal republic in Europe. It is one of the most developed countries in the world, with the highest nominal wealth per adult and the eighth-highest per capita gross domestic product according to the IMF. Switzerland ranks at or near the top globally in several metrics of national performance, including government transparency, civil liberties, quality of life, economic competitiveness, and human development. 

Switzerland's most important economic sector is manufacturing. Manufacturing consists largely of the production of specialist chemicals, health and pharmaceutical goods, scientific and precision measuring instruments and musical instruments. The largest exported goods are chemicals (34% of exported goods), machines/electronics (20.9%), and precision instruments/watches (16.9%). Exported services amount to a third of exports. The service sector – especially banking and insurance, tourism, and international organisations – is another important industry for Switzerland.

Largest firms 
This list shows firms in the Fortune Global 500, which ranks firms by total revenues reported before 31 March 2017. Only the top five firms (if available) are included as a sample.

Notable firms 
This list includes notable companies with primary headquarters located in the country. The industry and sector follow the Industry Classification Benchmark taxonomy. Organizations which have ceased operations are included and noted as defunct.

See also

 Economy of Switzerland
 List of restaurants in Switzerland

References

Switzerland